HMS Rodney was a two-deck 90-gun second-rate ship of the line of the Royal Navy. Launched in 1833, she was broken up in 1884.

History
Rodney was launched on 18 June 1833 at Pembroke Dockyard.

The majority of her commissions saw active service in the Mediterranean Sea, but she also served in the Black Sea during the Crimean War (1853–1856), and after being converted to a steam and screw propelled vessel, served in China as the flagship of Vice-Admiral Henry Keppel, commanded by captain Algernon Heneage from 21 January 1867.

Rodney was the ship where William Hall, later to become the first Black man and one of the first Canadians to win the Victoria Cross, began his naval career in 1852. On 29 October 1853, she ran aground in the Dardanelles.

Rodney was fitted with screw propulsion in 1860, completed on 11 January, and was the last unarmoured wooden battleship in full commission. She was broken up in 1882.

Captains who commanded Rodney
Over the decades after Rodneys launch, eight captains commanded her:

Notes

References

 Lavery, Brian (2003) The Ship of the Line – Volume 1: The development of the battlefleet 1650–1850. Conway Maritime Press. .
 "William Loney RN – Victorian Naval Surgeon" (Search – Mid-Victorian RN Vessel HMS Rodney)

 

Ships of the line of the Royal Navy
Rodney-class ships of the line
Ships built in Pembroke Dock
1833 ships
Crimean War naval ships of the United Kingdom
Maritime incidents in February 1847
Maritime incidents in October 1853